Lars Christopher Gillberg (born 19 April 1950), who has sometimes published as Gillberg and Gillberg with his wife Carina Gillberg, is a professor of child and adolescent psychiatry at Gothenburg University in Gothenburg, Sweden, and an honorary professor at the Institute of Child Health (ICH), University College London. He has also been a visiting professor at the universities of Bergen, New York, Odense, St George's (University of London), San Francisco, and Glasgow and Strathclyde.

Christopher Gillberg's extensive research (more than 500 publications indexed on the PubMed data base), has significantly contributed to the field of child and adolescent neuropsychiatry/developmental medicine in areas such as autism spectrum disorders, ADHD, epilepsy, intellectual disability, oppositional defiant disorder/conduct disorder, Tourette syndrome and anorexia nervosa. He is the most productive researcher of autism in the world. His research ranges from basic neuroscience, genetics and epidemiology, through to clinical presentations and prognosis, intervention and treatment. He is the founding editor of the journal European Child & Adolescent Psychiatry, and is the author and editor of many scientific and educational books and has written at least 30 books in these fields, which have been published in a wide variety of languages.

The media company Thomson Reuters have listed the researchers most frequently cited in a range of scientific journals deemed the world's most prestigious. Christopher Gillberg is among 15 Swedish researchers within the field of medicine featured in the list.

Awards
Professor Gillberg has received several awards for his research, including the Fernström prize in 1991, the Ingvar Award in 1995, The Ronald McDonald Major Award for Paediatrics in 1998, Ågrenska Major Medicine Prize in 2001, Philips Nordic Prize in 2004 – in the prize justification he was acknowledged for his commitment to the rights of patient privacy and confidentiality. In 2009, Carl XVI Gustav of Sweden presented Gillberg with The King's Medal of the Seraphim order for his contributions in the field of child and adolescent psychiatry. He received the Dahlberg award for his genetic research, and the Life Watch Award for Autism Research in 2010. In 2012 he was awarded one of Sweden's most prestigious scientific honours: the Söderberg Prize for Medicine ("Little Nobel Prize"). The prize is financed by Torsten Söderberg's Foundation and Ragnar Söderberg's Foundation and was handed out at a ceremony held at The Swedish Society of Medicine in Stockholm. In the prize justification it was emphasized that Christopher Gillberg "in a wise way combines specific research results with a versatile view of the human being and the patient as a bio-psychosocial whole". His commitment to the supervision of young researchers was also highlighted.

On 12 May Professor Christopher Gillberg was presented with the prestigious 2016 INSAR Lifetime Achievement Award at the International Meeting for Autism Research (IMFAR), held in Baltimore, Maryland, USA. INSAR (The International Society for Autism Research), that nominates the laureate, is a scientific and professional organization devoted to advancing knowledge about autism spectrum disorders. INSAR Lifetime Achievement Award acknowledges an individual who has made significant fundamental contributions to research on autism spectrum disorders that have had a lasting impact on the field.

In 2010, the Gillberg Neuropsychiatry Centre (GNC), within the Institute of Neuroscience and Physiology, Sahlgrenska Academy, University of Gothenburg, was founded. The centre was officially inaugurated by HM Queen Silvia in May 2011. The GNC works actively to recruit young scientists in the research fields of autism, ADHD, Oppositional Defiant Disorder/ Conduct Disorder (ODD/CD), anorexia nervosa, intellectual developmental disorder, language disorder, dyslexia, epilepsy, cerebral paresis and other ESSENCE (Early Symptomatic Syndromes Eliciting Neurodevelopmental Clinical Examinations). 
In January 2013 around 58 researchers were linked to the GNC. The staff at GNC and collaborators in other countries, work in child and adolescent psychiatry, child neurology, molecular genetics, community medicine, primary care, epidemiology, statistics, and twin methodology. External collaborators include University College London, Glasgow University, University of Edinburgh, University of Bergen, Karolinska Institute, Kōchi University, Kochi Prefecture, Young Epilepsy, and INSERM and the Pasteur Institute.
The GNC also works to ensure the dissemination of research, not only using scientific and popular science publications, but by continuous updating of the website (www.gnc.gu.se) and through the organization of international conferences.

Controversy
Gillberg is also known for his role in a controversy relating to the confidentiality of medical records. The controversy involved  public access under the Swedish Principle of Public Access (offentlighetsprincipen) to medical records and other personal data about a group of children participating in an early longitudinal study on ADHD/DAMP, commenced in 1977 at Gothenburg University. Two critics of DAMP and ADHD diagnoses, who had previously filed complaints that questioned the integrity of the study, invoked the Swedish Freedom of Information Act in order to gain access to the raw data of the study after their fraud allegations had been investigated and officially dismissed by the regional ethics committee. Gillberg and two chief physicians involved in the study stated that medical ethics principles prevented them from turning over sensitive personal and medical data as the participants' parents had been promised confidentiality in writing before giving informed consent on behalf of their children. However, the court ruled that all files related to the study were to be released under the Principle of Public Access. Rather than breaking their promises of confidentiality to the participants, the two chief physicians, along with a university administrator, shredded the sensitive files of the study. The following year, Gillberg, as head of the university's Neuropsychiatric Department, and the University Vice-Chancellor were convicted and fined for "breach of duty" in their capacity as public officials at a government institution that had failed to release the documents in accordance with the court order.

Autism research
In the early 1980s, the concept of an 'autism spectrum' was introduced by Lorna Wing and Gillberg. Gillberg has done extensive research into autism throughout his academic career. In 2003, a French and Swedish research team at the Institut Pasteur and the psychiatric departments at Gothenburg University and University of Paris, led by Thomas Bourgeron, Marion Leboyer and Gillberg, discovered the first precisely identified genetic mutations in individuals with autism. The team identified mutations altering two genes on the X chromosome which seem to be implicated in the formation of synapses (communication spaces between neurons), in two families where several members are affected. Previous studies, such as the Paris Autism Research International Sib-Pair Study (PARIS), coordinated by Gillberg and Marion Leboyer, have more generally associated the X-chromosome regions with autism. The 2003 breakthrough indicated the location of the mutation to be on the NLGN4 gene and the NGLN3 gene. The mutation prevents a complete protein from forming and is inherited from the mother.

Since 2006, Gillberg is involved in a large cross-disciplinary project titled "Autism spectrum conditions: the Gothenburg collaborative studies", financed by the Swedish Research Council (Vetenskapsrådet), expected to run until the end of 2009. The project is a collaboration between scientists specialized in child and youth psychiatry, molecular biology and neuroscience and involves a genetic part with an international study team of French, British and U.S. researchers examining various aspects autism. Some of the results were published during 2007. The project also includes a genetic study on the Faroe Islands.

Gillberg's criteria for Asperger syndrome
In 1989, Gillberg became instrumental in the publication of the first diagnostic criteria for Asperger syndrome. They are applied in clinical practice due to the adhesion to the original description of Hans Asperger. All of the following six criteria must be met for confirmation of diagnosis:

Severe impairment in reciprocal social interaction (at least two of the following)
inability to interact with peers
lack of desire to interact with peers
lack of appreciation of social cues
socially and emotionally inappropriate behavior
All-absorbing narrow interest (at least one of the following)
exclusion of other activities
repetitive adherence
more rote than meaning
Imposition of routines and interests (at least one of the following)
on self, in aspects of life
on others
Speech and language problems (at least three of the following)
delayed development
superficially perfect expressive language
formal, pedantic language
odd prosody, peculiar voice characteristics
impairment of comprehension including misinterpretations of literal/implied meanings
Non-verbal communication problems (at least one of the following)
limited use of gestures
clumsy/gauche body language
limited facial expression
inappropriate expression
peculiar, stiff gaze
Motor clumsiness: poor performance on neurodevelopmental examination

Gillberg's criteria differ from those given in the DSM-IV-TR. Some scholars have therefore criticized them for "making it difficult to compare with other studies." It has been argued that the failure of some research groups to replicate some of Gillberg's findings "may relate primarily to fundamental differences in diagnostic approach".

DAMP, MBD, and ADHD
In the 1970s, Gillberg played a leading role in developing the concept Deficits in Attention, Motor control and Perception (DAMP), a concept primarily used in Scandinavia. The DAMP concept as used in more recent publications, refers to Attention-deficit hyperactivity disorder (ADHD) in combination with Developmental Coordination Disorder (DCD). According to Gillberg, it constitutes a "subgroup of the diagnostic category of ADHD, conceptually similar – but not clinically identical – to the WHO concept of HKD (hyperkinetic disorder)" and is diagnosed on the basis of "concomitant attention deficit/hyperactivity disorder and developmental coordination disorder in children who do not have severe learning disability or cerebral palsy".

Some scholars disagree with the lumping of ADHD and DCD, with the argument that they are unrelated. Gillberg stated in 2003 that, although he feels that there is a "very real issue of how to deal with the conflict between splitting (ADHD plus developmental coordination disorder (DCD)) and lumping (DAMP)," he nevertheless feels that "the DAMP construct has been helpful in identifying a group of children with ADHD and multiple needs that will not be self evident if the diagnosis is just ADHD or just DCD." Before the Scandinavian studies, recognition that individuals with attention problems may also have difficulties with movement, perception, and memory had received little attention in studies. According to various studies, half of the children with ADHD also have DCD.

With the development of the ADHD concept, the previous, less precise, category of Minimal Brain Dysfunction (MBD), "a term almost universally employed in child psychiatry and developmental paediatrics from the 1950s to the early 1980s" was replaced. Gillberg began to study DAMP in the late 1970s, when ADHD was still called MBD and the DAMP concept has been adjusted as the term ADHD was introduced and became internationally used. Around 1990, DAMP had become a generally accepted diagnostic concept in two Nordic countries, but when the DSM-IV appeared in 1994, DAMP became considered a redundant term in many countries, since DAMP is essentially equivalent to ADHD in combination with DCD as defined by DSM-IV. Gillberg's four criteria for DAMP are: 
ADHD as defined in DSM-IV;
Developmental Coordination Disorder as defined in DSM-IV;
Condition not better accounted for by cerebral palsy; and
IQ higher than about 50 [Gillberg, 2003: box 1].

According to Gillberg, clinically severe form DAMP (or ADHD+DCD) affects about 1.5% of the general population of school age children; another few per cent are affected by more moderate variants. Boys are overrepresented; girls are currently probably underdiagnosed. There are many overlapping conditions, including conduct disorder, depression/anxiety, and academic failure. There is a strong link with autism spectrum disorders in severe DAMP. Familial factors and pre- and perinatal risk factors account for much of the variance. Psychosocial risk factors appear to increase the risk of marked psychiatric abnormality in DAMP. Outcome in early adult age was psychosocially poor in one study in almost 60% of unmedicated cases. About half of all cases with ADHD have DCD, and conversely, ADHD occurs in about half of all cases of DCD.

Gillberg has published around 80 papers on DAMP, ADHD and related conditions.

Legal case

 
One of Gillberg's research projects, the Gothenburg study, has become the center of a heated controversy. The controversy concerns the question to what extent the Principle of Public Access, which in Sweden supports transparency in publicly funded activities, can be applied to sensitive data collected in medical studies involving human subjects. In 2003, Gothenburg University was ordered by the court to release medical records and other sensitive data about a group of children who had participated in a longitudinal psychiatric study done by Gillberg and other researchers, to two individuals under the Freedom of Information Act; this was done despite the researchers' assertion that anonymization was not considered feasible due to the nature and length of the study (a small group of participants had been followed for a period of 16 years and the data included a combination of taped interviews, medical records, criminal records, school records, and psychiatric evaluations). The court ordered the university to set conditions for the access so that the interests of the children and the families would be protected.

In April 2003, the university's Vice-Chancellor set the conditions: one of the persons requesting access, the sociologist Eva Kärfve, would have to get her research project approved by the ethical review committee, and each concerned individual would have to consent before documents about her or him could be read by Eva Kärfve and Leif Elinder, the other person who had requested access. However, Kärfve and Elinder appealed the university's conditions and the Administrative Court of Appeal ruled that the conditions were unreasonable. In an analysis of the case, Sven Ove Hansson, professor and head of the Department of Philosophy and the History of Technology at the Royal Institute of Technology (KTH), Stockholm, a former member of the Swedish Government Research Advisory Board, wrote: "[I]t is particularly interesting to note that the Court of Administrative Appeal nullified the decision by Gothenburg University to require individual consent and approval from an ethical review committee before giving access to sensitive data on individual research subjects. These are two of the cornerstones of the scientific community's own system for protecting research subjects."

Background
Beginning in 1996, pediatrician Leif Elinder criticized Gillberg's research and alleged that the numbers reported by Gillberg were made up. Elinder became associated with the sociologist Eva Kärfve at Lund University, whose research had been devoted to early witch hunts and medieval myths in Europe. They coordinated their criticism and Kärfve wrote a book, published in 2000, rejecting most of the research on DAMP, and especially Gillberg's. Other psychiatrists and neuroscientists in Sweden defended the Gillberg group and argued that Elinder and Kärfve had crossed the line from scientific criticism to personal attacks and vilification. The conflict escalated further in 2002, when Kärfve and Elinder wrote separate letters to Gothenburg University, accusing the Gillberg group of scientific misconduct. The accusations were investigated by the Ethics Council and dismissed.

Elinder and Kärfve also demanded access to the original research material for the main DAMP studies. Under a section of the Swedish basic law that grants citizens access to government documents, Elinder and Kärfve were given full access to the documents by an administrative court. The university, the Gillberg group, and the participants of the study were strongly opposed to this decision, on the grounds that the material contained medical records and other sensitive information, and that the participants had been promised full confidentiality. A higher court decided that neither the participants, the researchers, nor their institution, were formally entitled to appeal the decision. When all legal avenues had been exhausted, two of Gillberg's coworkers and a university administrator destroyed the 12–27 years old research material. In the legal aftermath, Gillberg and the rector of Gothenburg University were found guilty of "misuse of office" for not complying with the administrative court's decision.

The two researchers (both chief physicians at Sahlgrenska University Hospital, one of them married to Gillberg), defended their decision to shred the files by referring to the promises of confidentiality that had been issued to the subjects of the study and the letters of objection that had been received from the families that they did not want their personal data used or shared with the private individuals. They argued that turning the files over would have exposed the researchers and the university to potential lawsuits from the subjects for failing to honor a written agreement. They were convicted and fined for destruction of government property.

In July 2005, the lower criminal court in Gothenburg upheld the right of Kärfve and Elinder to see any data from the Gothenburg study still held by the university. The court fined Gillberg for "misuse of office".

In 2006, Gillberg lodged a complaint with the European Court of Human Rights (ECHR). On 17 June 2008, the ECHR announced a "Decision to Communicate" in the case and a request for comment was submitted to the Swedish government, with a 15 October 2008 deadline for the initial response to the charges.

Reaction to the ruling
The Swedish court's decision to grant the two critics access to the data was controversial. When the study participants were contacted by Gillberg and asked if they would be prepared to have the data released, all but one family refused. Citing that, and the promise of confidentiality given to the participants as a precondition, Gillberg and the other researchers decided to not turn over the personal data. 267 Swedish doctors signed a letter in support of Gillberg's decision to not hand over the data. After the verdict, the chairman of the Central Ethical Review Board of Sweden, Johan Munch, said that in Swedish legislation, the Principle of Public Access is incompatible with promises of absolute confidentiality, and that the Central Ethical Review Board therefore no longer approves such promises. According to Martin Ingvar of the Karolinska Institute, medical researchers in Sweden will be forced to change the current practice because of the verdict. Ingvar told media that medical studies in Sweden must now adhere to a strict anonymization encoding, even in extensive studies like Gillberg's which contain large amounts of clinical material collected over long periods of time, in spite of the increase in cost and the larger margins of error.

Elisabeth Rynning, a professor of medical law at the University of Uppsala, questioned whether the court had been fully aware of the relevant laws. Access to these kinds of records may only be granted for the purpose of research or for the collection of statistics. Elinder had not stated any such purpose in his application, and Kärfve had only argued that the material would be useful for her research, not that it would actually be used in a research project. She was in fact not allowed to use the material in her research project, since that would have required a previous approval by an ethics committee. There was also the problem that Elinder and Kärfve requested the material as private citizens, while at the same time stating that they needed it in their professional capacities. If they had requested the material as representatives of their employers, the court would not have jurisdiction. Finally Rynning questioned how the court could decide that no one would be hurt, as the law requires, if Elinder and Kärfve were given full access to the data. Several participants had testified to the court that they would be deeply offended and hurt if Elinder and Kärfve could read their medical records.

The Swedish Parliamentary Ombudsman also investigated the affair. In the 18-page summary dedicated to the case in the yearly report by the Ombudsman, Gillberg and Gothenburg University are criticized for violating the Freedom of Information Act and thus Kärfve's and Elinder's civil right to access to records belonging to the state. Both the lower court and the appeal court were unanimous in finding Gillberg guilty of breach of duty arising from failure to comply in regards to the release of documents; additionally, the Supreme Court of Sweden did not agree to retry Gillberg's breach of duty case. In response to the concerns raised by Gillberg at the trial that a situation had arisen for him whereby "he was prevented by medical ethics and research ethics from disclosing information about the participants in the study and their next-of-kin", the Swedish Parliamentary Ombudsman stated that "the international declarations drawn up by the World Medical Association and also the European Convention [...] do not categorise them as undertakings that can be considered to take priority over Swedish law." The Parliamentary Ombudsman also stated that, "it is not possible to make decisions on issues concerning confidentiality until the release of a document is requested. It follows therefore that the assurances of confidentiality cited above cannot take priority over the law as it stands or a court's application of the statutes".

Law revisions and debate
In 2003, a bill was introduced in the Swedish parliament, Riksdagen, due to the secrecy issues raised during the trial that granted the two private individuals access to sensitive personal data. This bill did not pass, but in 2004, a new act on ethical review of research involving humans was introduced. Changes were put in place in order to strengthen the protection for human subjects participating in medical research and to expand the scope of the ethical councils, while bringing the Swedish legislation closer to the European Commission directive. The official act governing medical research was further adjusted in 2008: ethical review is now legally required in Sweden, the review committees have official status, and consent can be withdrawn by participants in medical research at any point. However, voices in the medical research community have raised concerns about law revisions' lack of attention to additional safeguards for researchers falsely accused of scientific misconduct and are calling for procedures that would ensure that scientific misconduct investigations are handled in a correct and legally secure manner.

The debate about the case between representatives from the social sciences and natural sciences has continued in the popular press and in media. In 2007, the controversy resulted in a book by science journalist Vanna Beckman, with a focus on the larger issues of biologism and sociologism as they played out in the debate, a book which also described the ideological battle against research in psychology and psychiatry driven by various religious groups. In April 2008, a hotly debated television documentary aired on Swedish television, where Kärfve and Erlinder returned to the spotlight to air their concerns about the shredding of the documents. 
However, the program was shut down in 2008 after the Board of Appeal condemned it for its lack of impartiality in relation to the said programme.

See further
Gothenburg Study of Children with DAMP

Notes

Selected publications by Gillberg

Journal articles

Books

 Coleman M, Gillberg C, The Autisms, Oxford University Press, 2012
 Gillberg C, ADHD and its many associated problems, Oxford University Press, 2014
 Gillberg C, Råstam M, Fernell E (red.) Barn och Ungdomspsykiatri, Natur & Kultur, 2015
 Gillberg C, ESSENCE Om ADHD, autism och andra utvecklingsavvikelser, Natur & Kultur, 2018

External links

Child psychiatric diagnoses – Christopher Gillberg – Iriss, 16 November 2007
Philips Prize – Information about the Philips Prize
European Child & Adolescent Psychiatry (journal)
The Autism Puzzle  (A BBC documentary featuring Gillberg)
An interview with Gillberg in Looking Up (an autism newsletter) 3:12, 2005.
Kärfe, Elinder, and others defend their accusations – "Rapid responses" submitted to British Medical Journal, 2004
 Gothenburg University, 2001 (in Swedish)
Riksförbundet Attention supports Gillberg Official web page in Swedish, 21 August 2005. (Riksförbundet Attention is a national Swedish association for people with neuropsychiatric disabilities.)
Riksföreningen Autism supports Gillberg Press release in Swedish. Undated, 2006. (Riksföreningen Autism is the national Swedish association for people with autism and autism-like disorders.)
Letter to the Swedish Chancellor of Justice The Swedish Child Neuropsychiatry Science Foundation. Letter detailing the actions by Christopher Gillberg opponents, the involvement of public figures and the media, and the legal process.
Autism And Pre Tactile Impotency

1950 births
Autism activists
Autism researchers
Bipolar disorder researchers
Living people
Swedish medical researchers
Swedish psychiatrists
Academic staff of the University of Gothenburg